Fourth of July Lake is an alpine lake in Custer County, Idaho, United States, located in the White Cloud Mountains in the Sawtooth National Recreation Area.  The lake is accessed from Sawtooth National Forest trail 109.

Fourth of July Lake is just west of Patterson Peak, northeast of Fourth of July Peak, and northwest of Washington Lake, although Washington Lake is in a separate basin.

References

See also
 List of lakes of the White Cloud Mountains
 Sawtooth National Recreation Area
 White Cloud Mountains

Lakes of Idaho
Lakes of Custer County, Idaho
Glacial lakes of the United States
Glacial lakes of the Sawtooth National Forest